The Naked Eye is a 1956 American documentary film about the history of photography directed by Louis Clyde Stoumen. It was nominated for an Academy Award for Best Documentary Feature.

Cast
 Raymond Massey as Narrator 
 Edward Weston

References

External links

1956 films
American documentary films
American black-and-white films
Films directed by Louis Clyde Stoumen
1956 documentary films
Documentary films about photographers
Works about the history of photography
1950s English-language films
1950s American films